This is a list of the official historical coats of arms or 'full heraldic achievements' of English primary and secondary education schools, grouped by region, as granted by the College of Arms. For some schools, the full achievement is displayed; for others just the escutcheon (shield) is shown.

East of England

East Midlands

London

North East England

North West England

South East England
{| class=wikitable style=font-size:95%
|- style="vertical-align:top; text-align:center;"
! style="width:206px;"| Image
! Details

|- valign=top
|align=center | 
| Ardingly, granted 1942
Escutcheon: Azure, on a triple mount in base a Passion cross between six martlets Or; on a chief of the last, between two crosses botonnee sable, a pale engrailed gules charged with an ostrich feather erect argent.
Crest: On a wreath of the colours, A pelican in her piety proper, beaked and legged Or, gorged with a collar gemel gules, the nest gold charged with a cross botonnee also gules.
Motto: Beati Mundo Corde (Blessed are the pure in heart)

|- valign=top
|align=center | 
| Bennett Memorial Dioceean, granted 19 December 1952
Escutcheon: Vert, a brock passant proper; on a chief argent, three gilly-flowers stalked and leaved also proper.
Motto: Semper Tenax (Ever holding fast)

|- valign=top
|align=center | 
| Bradfield, granted 16 November 1923
Escutcheon: Per chevron vert and azure, in chief two falcons jessed and belied Or and in base a saltire argent.
Motto: Benedictus Es O Domine, Doce Me Statuta Tua (Blessed art thou O Lord: O teach me thy statutes)

|- valign=top
|align=center | 
| Brighton, granted 18 June 1920
Escutcheon: Azure, two keys in saltire Or between in fesse two pelicans vulning themselves respectant argent and in chief a closed book of the third, edged and clasped of the second.
Motto: ΤΟ Δ’ΕΥ ΝΙΚΑΤΩ (Let right prevail)

|- valign=top
|align=center |  
| Brockenhurst, granted 20 August 1962
Escutcheon: Per chevron sable and gules, in chief two slips of oak fructed silver and in base a rose argent, barbed and seeded proper.
Crest: On a wreath of the colours, In front of a burst of trees a badger resting the dexter forepaw upon an open book proper, edged and bound gules.
Motto: Inter Silvas Quaerere Verum (And Seek for Truth in the Garden of Academus)

|- valign=top
|align=center | 
| Carmel (closed 1997), granted 10 June 1963 
Escutcheon: Per fesse azure and argent, in chief a seven-branched candlestick between, dexter, a stone tablet and, sinister. an open book, all Or and in base seven scrolls of the Law gules.
Motto: TBC (Know. Him (God) in All Thy Ways)

|- valign=top
|align=center | 
| Charterhouse, granted 20 June 1956
Escutcheon: Or, on a chevron between three annulets gules as many crescents of the field.
Motto: Deo Dante Dedi (God being the Giver)

|- valign=top
|align=center | 
| Christ's Hospital, adopted at unknown date
Escutcheon: Argent, a cross gules, in the first quarter a sword erect of the last; on a chief azure a rose of the field, barbed and seeded proper, between two fleurs-de-lys Or.
Motto: Honour All Men, Love the Brotherhood, Fear God, Honour the King.
This coat of arms is also used by King Edward's School, Witley and (slightly modified) by St Thomas' Hospital

|- valign=top
|align=center | 
| Cranleigh
Escutcheon:  
Motto: Ex Cultu Robur (From Culture comes Strength)

|- valign=top
|align=center | 
| Dartford Girls' Grammar, granted 20 June 1956
Escutcheon: Vert, in front of a fess wavy Argent charged with two barrulets wavy Azure a horse rampant also argent; on a chief of the last between two open books Proper [edged Or, bound Gules] a pale Murrey charged with a torch Or.
Crest: On a wreath Argent and Vert, A pomme, thereon a fess wavy Argent charged with a bar wavy Azure; over all a horse as in the Arms. 

|- valign=top
|align=center | 
| Douai (closed 1999), granted 25 September 1929
Escutcheon: Azure, three representations of the crown of St. Edmund, King and Martyr, Or; on a chief engrailed of the last an abbot's mitre between two fieurs-de-lys of the field.
Motto: Dominus Mihi Adiutor (The Lord is my helper)

|- valign=top
|align=center | 
| Dover, granted 30 January 1931
Escutcheon: Sable, a cross argent between four leopards' faces Or; on a chief of the last the castle with two towers of the field between two open books argent, edged gold bound gules.
Crest: On a wreath of the colours, A demi man (representing St. Martin) habited as a Roman soldier, holding in his dexter hand a sword with which he divides his cloak, flowing from his shoulders and supported by his sinister hand, all proper.
Motto: Non Recuso Laborem (I do not refuse the task)

|- valign=top
|align=center | 
| Epsom, granted 7 June 1910
Escutcheon: 'Per pale Azure and Sable, three fleurs-de-lis Or; on a chief of the last an open book Proper inscribed with the words "Olim meminisse juvabit' between in the dexter a lamp and in the sinister a rod of Aesculapius Gules.Crest: On a wreath Or and Azure, In front of an eagle's head between two wings Azure, three fleurs-de-lis Or.Motto: Deo Non Fortuna (From God not from luck)|- valign=top
| 
| Eton, granted in 1449 by Henry VI
Escutcheon: Sable, three lily-flowers argent on a chief per pale azure and gules in the dexter a fleur-de-lys in the sinister a lion passant guardant or. 
Motto: Floreat Etona (May Eton Flourish)|- valign=top
|align=center | 
| Hayling, granted 20 December 1968
Escutcheon: Gules, a cross Or between four keys erect, wards to the sinister, argent, on a chief argent three roses gules, barbed and seeded proper; a bordure barry wavy argent and azure.Crest: On a wreath of the colours, In front of a rock Or, perched thereon a heron proper, four bezants.Motto: With These Keys 

|- valign=top
|align=center |  
| Hurstpierpoint, granted 1 June 1931
Escutcheon: Per pale Argent and Ermine, dexter on a bend cottised Sable a cross couped between two martlets of the first, on a chief Gules an eagle, round the head a crown of glory, Or, sinister two wolves passant counterpassant also Gules; all within a bordure engrailed Azure.Motto: Beati Mundo Corde (Blessed are the pure in heart)|- valign=top
|align=center | 
| King's, Canterbury, adopted from Canterbury cathedral
Escutcheon: Azure, on a cross, argent, the letter Χ, surmounted by the letter i, sableMotto: Age dum agis (Do well what you do)|- valign=top
|align=center | 
| King Edward VI, Southampton, assumed circa 1553, confirmed 1979
Escutcheon: Quarterly 1st & 4th Azure three fleurs-de-lis two and one Or 2nd & 3rd Gules three lions passant guardant in pale Or armed and langued Azure.Crest: Upon the Royal helm the imperial crown Proper, thereon a lion statant gardant Or imperially crowned Proper.Supporters: Dexter a lion rampant gardant Or imperially crowned Proper sinister a dragon Gules.Motto: Dieu Et Mon Droit (God and my right)|- valign=top
|align=center | 
| King Edward's, Witley adopted at unknown date
Escutcheon: Argent, a cross gules, in the first quarter a sword erect of the last; on a chief azure a rose of the field, barbed and seeded proper, between two fleurs-de-lys Or.Motto: United by Diversity since 1553This coat of arms is also used by Christ's Hospital and (slightly modified) by St Thomas' Hospital

|- valign=top
|align=center | 
| Lancing, granted 1923. 
Escutcheon: Argent, on a bend cotised Sable a cross couped between two martlets of the first; all within a bordure engrailed Azure; the whole surmounted of a chief Ermine thereon between two purses Or a pale of the third charged with a lily also Or.Motto: Beati Mundo Corde (Blessed are the pure in heart)|- valign=top
|align=center | 
| Leighton Park, granted 1926
Escutcheon: Sable six oak leaves three two and one Or.|- valign=top
|align=center | 
| Licensed Victuallers', granted 20 October 1954
Escutcheon: Vert semee of ears of barley, a swan, wings elevated, ducally gorged, a bordure invected Or. Crest: Out of a coronet composed of hop fruit proper set upon a circlet Or, a cedar tree gold.Motto: Fidelis Ad Finem (Faithful to the end)|- valign=top
|align=center | 
| Portsmouth Grammar, granted 20 March 1957
Escutcheon: Per fesse gules and sable, in chief a lion couchant and in base two Cornish choughs and a crescent, therein between the horns an estoile of eight points, all Or.Crest: On a wreath of the colours, A horse's head per fesse gules and sable, charged in base with a sun in splendour Or.Motto: Praemia Virtutis Honores (Honours are the reward of virtue)|- valign=top
|align=center | 
| Ranelagh, assumed (from founder Richard Jones, 1st Earl of Ranelagh)
Escutcheon: Azure a cross between four pheons Or.Crest: On a cap of maintenance Gules turned up Ermine a dexter arm embowed in armour holding an arrow all Proper.Supporters: Two griffins per fess Vert and Or.Motto: Coelitus Mihi Vires (My Strength Is From Heaven)|- valign=top
|align=center | 
| Radley
Escutcheon: Argent an open Book garnished Gules clasps and buckles Or thereon inscribed the words SICUT SERPENTAE SICUT COLUMBAE between three crosses pattee of the second on a Chief of the last a Key in bend sinister of the first surmounted by a similar Key in bend dexter Gold between to the dexter a Serpent nowed and erect and to the sinister a Dove both Proper.Motto: Sicut Serpentes Sicut Columbae (Be ye wise as serpents, and harmless as doves)|- valign=top
|align=center | 
| Roedean granted 7 Dec 1921
Escutcheon: Per fesse wavy azure and argent, on a mount vert in base over a book expanded proper a roe-deer also proper, collared and chained and charged on the shoulder with a gridiron Or.Motto: Honneur aulx dignes (Honour the worthy) |- valign=top
|align=center | 
| St Edward's, granted 5 December 2017
Escutcheon: Azure a Cross flory between four Ancient Crowns impaling Per fess Sable and Or a Pale counterchanged in the Or an Ermine Spot Sable and in the Sable a Trefoil slipped Or the whole within a Bordure also Or.Crest: Upon a Helm with a Wreath Argent and Azure Issuant from a Cup Or a Dagger erect point downwards Argent hilt and pommel Or.Motto: Pietas Parentum (Parental devotion)|- valign=top
|align=center | 
| St Lawrence, granted 15 April 1929
Escutcheon: Gules, an open book argent, edged and surmounted by a Celestial crown or on a chief of the second an annulet between two crosses patée of the first.Crest:  On a wreath of the colours, in front of two amphibanes entwined or, an escallop argent.Supporters: Two griffins per fess vert and or.Motto: In Bono Vince (Overcome Evil With Good)

|- valign=top
|align=center | 
| St Swithun's, granted 9 June 1936
Escutcheon: Azure on a pale between two Keys ward upwards and outwards or a representation of St. Swithun of the first.Crest: On a Wreath of the Colours a Lion rampant or supporting with the forepaws a Key ward upwards Azure and resting the dexter hind leg on a Hurt.Motto: Caritas Humilitas Sinceritas (Charity, Humility, Sincerity )|- valign=top
|align=center | 
| Shiplake, granted 20 September 1962
Escutcheon: Azure, a chevron gules fimbriated argent, between in chief two Viking ships, pennons flying, Or, sails set silver, and in base a pair of scales gold.Crest: On a wreath tenne, azure and gules, in front of the battlements of a tower sable, an owl proper. 
Motto: Exemplum Docet (The Example Teaches)|- valign=top
|align=center | 
| Stowe, granted in 1923.
Escutcheon: Quarterly indented Argent and Or, first a lion rampant Azure, second a pile Gules, third a pile Vert thereon a cross of the second bearing five torteaux, fourth three martlets of the third.Motto: Persto Et Praesto (I stand firm and I stand first)|- valign=top
|align=center | 
| Summer Fields, granted 1 July 1963
Escutcheon: Gules, two bars argent between in chief two bezants and in base three lily flowers proper.Crest: On a wreath of the colours, Upon a mount vert, in front of a port between two towers Or an ox passant gules.Motto: Mens Sana In Corpore Sano (Healthy Mind in a Healthy Body)|- valign=top
|align=center | 
| Tonbridge, granted 16 March 1923
Escutcheon: Quarterly gules and azure, a cross fillet Or between in the first and fourth quarters a fesse raguly between three boars' heads couped argent, armed and langued azure, and in the second and third quarters three lions rampant gold.Crest: On a wreath of the colours, A boar's head erased per pale gules and sable, armed and langued azure, gorged with a coronet composed of fleurs-de-lis Or.Motto: Deus Dat Incrementum (God Giveth the Increase)|- valign=top
|align=center | 
| Twyford, granted 23 January 2009
Escutcheon: Argent two Bars Azure each charged with a Barrulet Or overall a Pale Pean.Crest: A demi-Bull Pean armed and unguled Or winged Argent supporting between the legs a Saxon Long Cross Azure pommelled Or.Motto: Vince Patientia (Conquer with Patience or "It's dogged 'as done it")|- valign=top 
|align=center | 
| Winchester, date of grant unknown
Escutcheon: Sable, three lilies Argent.Motto: Manners Makyth Man 

|}

South West England

West Midlands

Yorkshire & the Humber

See also
Armorial of UK schools
Armorial of UK universities
The Armorial Register
Heraldry

References

Further reading
 Scholastic arms; the arms, crests or badges used by four hundred schools, colleges, and universities: Beaulah, G. K, 1936, Manchester
 Armorial bearings of British schools'': Christie-Murray, David, and Escott, Dan [1967?], Cambridge.

Armorials of the United Kingdom
Schools in England